Heather Margarita Small (born 20 January 1965) is a British soul singer and former lead vocalist of the band M People. Her subsequent debut solo studio album, Proud, was released in 2000.

Career

1987–1998: Hot House and M People
Small was born and raised on a council estate in Ladbroke Grove, West London. She joined her first group, Hot House, as a singer while she was still a teenager. She was the studio singer voice of the re-recorded version of "Ride on Time" by Black Box. She had a chance meeting with Manchester DJ, Mike Pickering, formerly of Quando Quango, which led to sales of over 10 million albums worldwide with the group M People. They had considerable success with songs such as "Moving On Up", "One Night In Heaven" and "Search for the Hero".

In 1997, Small performed in "Perfect Day", the official 1997 Children in Need charity release, alongside a broad range of artists, including Tom Jones and Lou Reed. It sold over a million copies and was the UK's number one single for three weeks.

In 1998, Small and M People took some time off to pursue solo projects after The Best of M People was released.

2000–2005: Proud
In 2000, Small released her debut solo album, Proud, and a single of the same name, closely affiliated with the British Olympic team of the time. The single, which was used for the first season and the last episode of the final season of Queer as Folk, is Small's signature song, with which she achieved international success. When Oprah Winfrey was looking for a song to sum up the work she had been striving to achieve over her twenty-year career, she contacted Small, and "Proud" became the theme song to The Oprah Winfrey Show; in 2005 Small made her American television debut on the show. Later the same year, "Proud" became the theme song for the American reality weight-loss show The Biggest Loser.

"Holding On" was released as the next single, followed in November 2000 by a duet single with Tom Jones, called "You Need Love Like I Do".

Small took time off to look after her newborn son and record her second solo album. She occasionally appeared on various TV programs such as Parkinson and Songs of Praise. She also sang three songs at the Tsunami Relief Concert at the Millennium Stadium in Cardiff.

In 2005, a second M People greatest hits collection, Ultimate Collection, was released. The record featured both the biggest M People hits and two of Small's solo singles. "Proud" was re-released from this album and reached number 33 on the UK Singles Charts. M People reunited and played together on an arena tour in 2005, and they have played a few times each year afterwards.

2006–2008: Close to a Miracle
Small released a new single, "Radio On", in the UK on 17 July 2006. Her second solo album, Close to a Miracle, was released on 24 July, followed by a second single of the same name released digitally on 25 September 2006. It also included a previously unreleased track, "Changes". The album was a commercial disappointment—it charted for one week at number 57, and both supporting singles failed to reach the Top 100—but a short UK solo tour later in the autumn was received well.

In 2007, Small collaborated with Icelandic tenor Garðar Thór Cortes on a song called "Luna". It was released as a single from his album Cortes and reached number two in the Icelandic online music charts. A new song was recorded to celebrate 200 years since the abolition of the slave trade, and Small performed at a concert in London to mark the anniversary on 10 November 2007. On 26 May 2008, Small performed alongside Stereophonics and Feeder at the Millennium Stadium in Cardiff as part of the celebrations of Wales's success at the 2008 Grand Slam. In addition, Small performed three nights at Ronnie Scott's in October as part of her 2008 tour, and headlined at Manchester Pride.

On 24 August 2008, she performed at the Visa London 2012 Party to celebrate the handover as host city of the Olympic Games from Beijing, China, to London. Small sang "Proud", which was the unofficial anthem of Team GB at the Athens Games in 2004, and was the official anthem of the London 2012 Games. In December 2008, she performed "Proud" again on the 2008 BBC Sports Personality of the Year programme, as a soundtrack to a montage of British Olympian achievements at Beijing.

Late 2008: Strictly Come Dancing
In 2008, Small was one of the sixteen celebrities in the sixth series of BBC's Strictly Come Dancing, where she was partnered with newcomer Brian Fortuna. The couple were placed ninth overall in the series, and were in the bottom two on four occasions, in weeks 4, 5, 7, and 8. They were eventually voted off by the judges when they lost in the dance-off against Rachel Stevens. Small also appeared in an associated BBC Three series called Dancing on Wheels.

2009–present

From late 2008 and throughout 2009, Small toured the UK. The setlist included Small's solo tracks, M People songs, and some jazz covers.

It was announced in July 2010 that Small would take Chaka Khan's place alongside Anastacia and Lulu for the second Here Come the Girls tour, which took place across the UK during November and December 2010. On 20 October 2010, she was rewarded with a BASCA Gold Badge Award in recognition of her contribution to music.

In April 2011, Small performed as half-time entertainment at London's Twickenham Stadium for the annual St. George's Day Premiership Rugby fixture hosted by Wasps.  Performing with educational events company Pro-Excel, Small performed "Proud" and "Search for The Hero", and led a backing dance troupe of 546 UK students, becoming the Guinness World Record Holder for "The World's Biggest ever Backing Dance Troupe for a Popstar".

On 29 October 2012, Small appeared at the 2012 Pride of Britain Awards, and sang "Proud" as a tribute to the athletes of the London 2012 Olympic Games.

During 2017, Small participated in the Camino de Santiago pilgrimage for the BBC, along with Neil Morrissey, Debbie McGee, Ed Byrne, Kate Bottley, Raphael Rowe, and JJ Chalmers. She commented on the experience afterwards: "I was a believer before I set off, but this trip made me realise my faith and beliefs were much stronger than I had realised."

In 2018, Small celebrated 25 years of singing. She toured around the UK, celebrating her and M People's music.

Alongside the tour, Small planned to release a new album, Heather Small: Orchestral Greatest Hits, in May 2018, but on 3 May, the project was declared to be cancelled.

Small toured from 10 April to 26 April 2019.

In January 2022, Small appeared on the third series of The Masked Singer as "Chandelier". She was first to be unmasked.

Charity work
Small actively supports several charities, such as BeatBullying, the Aiden Cox Foundation, Mencap (for which she performed) and St Luke's Midnight Walk. She attended an anti-racism ceremony at 10 Downing Street for "Show Racism The Red Card", which was also attended by Sporting Elite, the prime minister, and others. Small works regularly with Barnardo's; she has also become an ambassador of Asthma UK, as she suffered from asthma as a child. She has also said that she supports "a few charities" including the Rio Ferdinand Foundation and Greenhouse Sports.

Personal life
Small lives in West London. In the 1990s, she had a long-term relationship with rugby player and coach Shaun Edwards, with whom she has a son, Labour Party councillor James Small-Edwards. In 2012, she married lawyer David Neita.

Discography

Albums

Singles

References

External links

Heather Small on Myspace
Pride of Manchester – Heather Small interview
Heather Small site
Heather Small on Pledge Music

1965 births
Living people
2012 Summer Olympics cultural ambassadors
Singers from London
20th-century Black British women singers
English people of Jamaican descent
English contraltos
English women in electronic music
21st-century Black British women singers
English house musicians
English soul musicians
British contemporary R&B singers